Orphnaeus is a genus of centipedes in the family Oryidae. It was described by Danish entomologist Frederik Vilhelm August Meinert in 1870. Centipedes in this genus range from 3 cm to 13 cm in length, have 53 to 131 pairs of legs, and are found in tropical regions.

Species
There are 14 valid species:

 Orphnaeus atopus (Chamberlin, 1920)
 Orphnaeus bohlsi Attems, 1903
 Orphnaeus brasilianus (Humbert & Saussure, 1870) 
 Orphnaeus brevilabiatus (Newport, 1845)
 Orphnaeus fangaroka Saussure & Zehntner L., 1902
 Orphnaeus guillemini (Gervais, 1847)
 Orphnaeus heteropodus Lawrence, 1963
 Orphnaeus maculatus  Lawrence, 1960
 Orphnaeus madegassus Lawrence, 1960
 Orphnaeus meruinus Attems, 1909
 Orphnaeus multipes Manfredi, 1939
 Orphnaeus polypodus Silvestri, 1895
 Orphnaeus porosus Verhoeff K. W., 1937
 Orphnaeus validus Lawrence, 1953

References

 

 
 
Centipede genera
Animals described in 1870
Taxa named by Frederik Vilhelm August Meinert